DSW is an international non-governmental organisation addressing Sexual & Reproductive Health (SRH) and population dynamics. DSW funds its project and advocacy work from private donations and the financial support of governments, foundations and other organisations.
It has its headquarters in Hannover, Germany.

History 

DSW was founded in 1991 as a private non-profit foundation by German entrepreneurs Erhard Schreiber and Dirk Rossmann. DSW opened country offices in the 1990s, in Ethiopia, Kenya, Tanzania and Uganda, to provide field-based services. In 2000, DSW opened an EU Liaison office in Brussels, Belgium, to help mobilize resources in the European Union—collectively the world’s largest donor of development assistance—to improve global health with a focus on sexual and reproductive health.

Activities 

DSW’s activities are focused on promoting sustainable demographic development, empowering women and their role in society, reducing and limiting the spread of HIV/AIDS, and improving the quality of life of young people in developing countries.

DSW runs a Youth-to-Youth Initiative in East Africa that attempts to empower youth to play an active role in improving Sexual & Reproductive Health in their communities and their countries, through peer education, advocacy and income-generating activities. In implementing this program, DSW supports over 1,000 youth clubs with a combined total membership of 30,000 youth and adolescents.

In Europe, DSW is involved in awareness-raising activities about the links between population dynamics, environment and health. Abroad, DSW promotes development projects in countries with a high need for family planning, sexual and reproductive health education and other services related to SRH, particularly those countries most afflicted by poor indicators for Millennium Development Goals 3 and 5 (child mortality and maternal health).

Officially registered as a foundation under German law, DSW provides sub-granting to other civil society actors advocating in the field of SRH, in addition to conducting advocacy itself. DSW seeks to engage both corporate and political actors to ensure that sexual and reproductive health education and contraception is strengthened and financially supported in developing countries.  This includes activities such as liaising with governments, parliamentarians and partner organizations at the national and international levels in Europe and the Global South to vote in favour of SRH-related legislation, or to increase funding for sexual and reproductive health programmes generally. DSW produces an annual Euromapping report, which scrutinizes EU Official Development Assistance (ODA) commitments and disbursements.

DSW also plays a capacity building role in developing countries to increase civil society's ability to advocate effectively towards governments and donors to integrate SRH in their ODA contributions. DSW runs two training centres in Uganda and Ethiopia, supported by German women’s clothing chain BONITA GmbH & Co. KG, that focus on the capacity building of youth-serving organizations to address questions about health, sexuality and contraception.

In 2005, DSW helped found the Alfred Biolek Stiftung on AIDS in Africa, and continues to provide administrative support for their activities.

DSW relies on the advice of notable international experts and public figures on various thematic issues, including Alfred Biolek, Margot Käßmann, Nafis Sadik, Rita Süssmuth, Klaus Töpfer and Ernst Ulrich von Weizsäcker.

See also 
 International Conference on Population and Development
 International Development
 Reproductive Health
 Reproductive rights
 List of population concern organizations

Motto: Empowering People for a Healthy Future

References

External links 
 www.dsw.org
 youth-to-youth.org

Population concern advocacy groups
Population concern organizations
Population organizations
Development charities based in Germany
International organisations based in Germany
Foundations based in Germany
Medical and health organisations based in Lower Saxony
Organizations established in 1991
1991 establishments in Germany